Richard Fournaux (born 17 December 1963) is a Belgian politician and a member of the MR. He was elected as a member of the Belgian Senate in 2007.

Notes

Living people
Reformist Movement politicians
21st-century Belgian politicians
Members of the Senate (Belgium)
1963 births